The coat of arms of Romania was adopted in the Romanian Parliament on 10 September 1992 as a representative coat of arms for Romania. It is based on the Lesser Coat of Arms of the Kingdom of Romania (used between 1922 and 1947), redesigned by Victor Dima. As a central element, it shows a golden aquila holding a cross in its beak, and a mace and a sword in its claws. It also consists of the three colors (red, yellow, and blue) which represent the colors of the national flag. The coat of arms was augmented on 11 July 2016 to add a representation of the Steel Crown of Romania.

History

The idea behind the design of the coat of arms of Romania dates from 1859, when the two Romanian countries, Wallachia and Moldavia, united under Prince Alexandru Ioan Cuza. Then the two heraldic symbols, the golden aquila and the aurochs, were officially juxtaposed.

Until 1866, there were many variants of the coat of arms, regarding the background color and the number of times the two main elements where represented. In 1866, after Carol I was elected Prince of Romania, the shield was divided into quarters: in the first and fourth an eagle was depicted, and in the second and third the aurochs; above the shield the arms of the reigning Hohenzollern-Sigmaringen family was placed. After 1872, the coat of arms included the symbol of southern Bessarabia (after 1877, of Dobruja), two dolphins, in the fourth quarter; and the one of Oltenia, a golden lion, in the third quarter; on the shield the Steel Crown was placed, as a symbol of sovereignty and independence, after the Romanian War of Independence.

The coat of arms remained unchanged until 1922, after World War I, when Transylvania was united with the Kingdom of Romania. Then the coat of arms of Transylvania was placed in the fourth quarter, with the Turul (almost all motivs including the supposed Turul can be found in the "Notita Dignitatum" in form of late roman empire shield designs) replaced by a black aquila, the third quarter depicted the joined coats of arms of Banat and Oltenia (the bridge of Apollodorus of Damascus and a golden lion respectively), and the coat of arms of Dobruja was placed in an insertion. The shield was placed on the chest of a golden crossed and crowned aquila, as a symbol of the Latinity of the Romanians. The aquila was placed on a blue shield, capped with the Steel Crown. The coat of arms had three versions: lesser, middle (with supporters and motto), and greater (the middle arms on a red mantle lined with ermine).

After 1948, the Communist authorities changed both the flag and the coat of arms. The coat of arms was rather an emblem, faithful to the Communist pattern: a landscape (depicting a rising sun, a tractor and an oil drill) surrounded by stocks of wheat tied together with a cloth in the colors of the national flag. Until 1989, there were four variants, the first being changed shortly after 1948 (the proclamation of the republic), again changed in 1952 (a red star was added), and finally in 1966, when Romania ceased to be a People's Republic and became a Socialist Republic.

Immediately after the 1989 Revolution, the idea came up of giving Romania a new, representative coat of arms. In fact, the very symbol of the Revolution was the flag with a hole in its middle where the communist coat of arms had been cut out.

The heraldic commission set up to design a new coat of arms for Romania worked intensely, subjecting to the Parliament two final designs which were then combined. What emerged is the current design adopted by the two chambers of the Romanian Parliament in their joint session on September 10, 1992.

In April 2016, deputies of the Judiciary Committee endorsed a bill voted previously by the Senate that returns the crown on the head of the eagle and mandates the public authorities to replace the existing emblems and seals to those provided by law until 31 December 2018 (to mark the centenary of the Union of Transylvania with Romania on 1 December 1918). The bill was adopted by the Chamber of Deputies on 8 June 2016 and promulgated by President Klaus Iohannis on 11 July 2016.

Description

The shield surmounting the eagle is divided into five fields, one for each historical province of Romania with its traditional symbol:

 golden aquila – Wallachia (Țara Românească)
 aurochs – Moldavia (Moldova), Bukovina (Bucovina) and Maramureș
 dolphins – the seaside: Southern Bessarabia/Budjak (18671878) and Dobruja (after 1878)
 a black aquila for Crișana and seven castles, a sun and a moon for Transylvania (Transilvania)
 lion and Trajan's Bridge– Oltenia, Banat and Timok Valley

Romania’s coat of arms has as a central element the golden aquila holding an Orthodox cross. Traditionally, this eagle appears in the arms of the Argeș county, the town of Pitești and the town of Curtea de Argeș. It stands for the “nest of the Basarabs”, the nucleus around which Wallachia was organised.

Since July 11, 2016 the coat of arms has been altered to include the heraldic representation of the Steel Crown of King Carol. A symbol of its royal past and a token for the period during 1881 and 1947 when Romania was de facto and de jure a monarchy, ruled by the Hohenzollern-Sigmaringen house through its Romanian branch, founded by Carol.

The aquila, being the symbol of Latinity and a heraldic bird of the first order, symbolises courage, determination, the soaring toward great heights, power, grandeur. It is to be found also in Transylvania's coat of arms.

The shield on which it is placed is azure, symbolising the sky. The eagle holds in its talons the insignia of sovereignty: a mace and a sword, the latter reminding of Moldavia’s ruler, Stephen the Great whereas the mace reminds of Michael the Brave, the first unifier of the Romanian Countries. On the bird's chest there is a quartered escutcheon with the symbols of the historical Romanian provinces (Wallachia, Oltenia, Moldavia, Bessarabia, Transylvania, the Banat, Crisana, Maramureș) as well as two dolphins reminding of the country's Black Sea Coast (Dobruja).

In the first quarter, Wallachia's coat of arms, an aquila or holding in its beak a golden Orthodox cross, accompanied by a golden sun on the right and a golden new moon on the left, is displayed against an azure background.

In the second quarter, Moldavia's traditional coat of arms is shown, gules: an aurochs head sable with a mullet of or between its horns, a cinquefoil rose on the dexter and a waning crescent on the sinister, both argent.

The third quarter features the traditional coat of arms of the Banat and Oltenia, gules: over waves, a golden bridge with two arched openings (symbolising Roman emperor Trajan's Bridge over the Danube), wherefrom comes a golden lion holding a broadsword in its right forepaw.

The fourth quarter shows the coat of arms of Transylvania, Maramureș and Crișana: a shield parted by a narrow fesse, gules; in the chief, on azure, there is a black aquila with golden beak coming out of the fesse, accompanied by a golden sun on the dexter and a crescent argent on the sinister (symbolizing the Székelys); on the base, on or, there are seven crenellated towers, placed four and three (symbolizing the Saxons).

Also represented are the lands adjacent to the Black Sea (Dobruja), on azure: two dolphins affronts, head down.

Gallery

See also

Romanian heraldry
Emblem of the Socialist Republic of Romania
Coat of arms of Moldova

References

External links

 Law establishing the coat of arms of Romania (1867), adopted on 24 April 1867.
 Law modifying the coat of arms of Romania (1872), published in the Monitorul Oficial no. 57 of 11/23 March 1872.
 Law establishing the coat of arms of the Kingdom of Romania... (1921), published in the Monitorul Oficial no. 92 of 29 July 1921, pp. 3569–3573
 Law 102/1992 describing the coat of arms
 Law 30/2016 concerning the change of the Law 102/1992
The coat of arms on the Romanian Presidency website
Description of Romania's coat of arms on romania.org

 
Romania
National symbols of Romania
Romania
Romania
Romania
Romania
Romania
Romania
Romania
Romania
Romania
Romania
Romania
Romania
Romania
Romania
Romania